The Polish Speedway First League or Liga.1 żużlowa is the second division of motorcycle speedway in Poland. It is below the Ekstraliga and is sponsored by the sports online betting company ewinner.

Past winners

References 

Speedway leagues
Professional sports leagues in Poland